Viktor D. Sonnenfeld (21 January 1902 – 30 March 1969) was prominent Croatian translator and philosopher.

Biography
Sonnenfeld was born to a Jewish family in Petrijevci, near Osijek, on 21 January 1902. In Osijek, Sonnenfeld finished elementary school and gymnasium, and in Zagreb and Marseille, he studied philosophy. All his life Sonnenfeld worked and acted in Osijek. He worked at the Osijek daily "Hrvatski list", and for 20 years at "Glas Slavonije" as the editor of cultural section. Sonnenfeld translated works of German philosophers and writers such as; Immanuel Kant, Georg Wilhelm Friedrich Hegel, Friedrich Nietzsche and others. Overall, from German to Croatian, he translated 940 titles. City and University Library in Osijek has stored Sonnenfeld personal library, a legacy of the 3345 book. Sonnenfeld retired and died in 1969, and was buried at Jewish part of the cemetery Sv. Ana, Osijek.

Translations
From German to Croatian:
Filozofija povijesti (Lectures on the Philosophy of History, 1951)
Dvije rasprave (Prolegomena to Any Future Metaphysics, 1953)
Fenomenologija duha (The Phenomenology of Spirit, 1955)
Odabrane filozofske rasprave (Die Bestimmung des Menschen, 1956)

References

Bibliography

1902 births
1969 deaths
People from Osijek
Croatian Jews
Austro-Hungarian Jews
Croatian Austro-Hungarians
Croatian translators
20th-century Croatian philosophers
Continental philosophers
20th-century translators
Burials at Saint Anne Cemetery